Miguel Ángel Rodríguez Gallegos (born 5 January 1967 in Chihuahua) is a Mexican race walker.

Achievements

External links
 
 

1967 births
Living people
Mexican male racewalkers
Athletes (track and field) at the 1991 Pan American Games
Athletes (track and field) at the 1995 Pan American Games
Athletes (track and field) at the 1992 Summer Olympics
Athletes (track and field) at the 1996 Summer Olympics
Athletes (track and field) at the 2000 Summer Olympics
Athletes (track and field) at the 2004 Summer Olympics
Olympic athletes of Mexico
Sportspeople from Chihuahua (state)
World Athletics Championships medalists
Pan American Games silver medalists for Mexico
Pan American Games medalists in athletics (track and field)
Medalists at the 1991 Pan American Games
Medalists at the 1995 Pan American Games
20th-century Mexican people